Minto is an unincorporated community straddling the boundary of Sunbury County and Queens County, New Brunswick, Canada. It held village status prior to 2023. It is located on the north shore of Grand Lake, approximately 50 kilometres northeast of Fredericton.

Minto is known to have taken its present name in 1904 upon the retirement of Canada's eighth Governor General, The Earl of Minto. and the story remains that the village adopted its name from the local Minto Hotel.  From the St. John Daily Sun of 1903: "Just how the name of Minto came to be adopted is said to have occurred in this way.  A letter which was sent from Moncton to Mr. Kennedy was enclosed in an envelope which bore the name of the Minto hotel, Moncton.  The family thought Minto a good name for their hotel, and so it was named.  Then the people generally adopted the name for the place, and so the railway people designated it."

History

Minto did not feel the depression, or at least did not feel it in the same way as most other places in Canada; during recession and the Great Depression, Minto was profiting from a coal mining boom.  The coal brought a level of financial prosperity to the community in the early 1900s, which by the late 1930s turned into a profitable venture for companies, and brought starvation and disease to a then impoverished community.  As stated in the United Mine Workers' Journal of 1937, "Nowhere on the American continent, is there a strife which combines the elements of greed, harshness, cold, suffering, and want, as exists [in Minto]."

Early in Minto's coal mining exploits, land owners were permitted to mine under their own land without obtaining a license from the Crown or paying any royalties, which ended in 1915.  During the boom, both mining conditions and the living quarters of miners' families degraded with lowering wages and lack of maintenance in the mines and homes supplied to the miners families.  Although a tally of the number of deaths related to the coal mining industry in Minto is not available, deaths did occur.

Amalgamation of Minto and surrounding communities 
On 1 January 2023, Minto was amalgamated with the village of Chipman and all or part of five local service districts to form the new village of Grand Lake. The community's name remains in official use.

The villages of Minto and Chipman protested the forced amalgamation. The mayor of Minto (2021), Erica Barnett, stated in a letter posted on the Village of Minto's Facebook page that "the government's current plan is absolutely not in the best interest for either Minto or Chipman..."  She mentioned also that this was a fact of reducing the provincial funding the villages got. This created an uproar among the townsfolk who were scared of losing the few things the village had, such as their cared-for arena. The public also feared "having to combine health clinics, schools and fire stations." The distance of 24 km between the two villages could ultimately cause major issues.

Coal Mining Industry 

The need of transporting coal brought the railway to Minto, and was to make the area "the most prosperous place in Canada." By 1904 the railway was completed as far as Minto, merging with the existing Central, however by 1905 completion to Fredericton was abandoned and the remaining railway was not built until 1913.

Although the railway lines through Minto have since been completely removed, the railway station continues on as a local museum.  By the end of 2010, coal mining in Minto ended when the last coal mining company, NB Coal, closed.

During the early years of the Great Depression, the New Brunswick Power Corporation built the province's first thermal generating station south of the village on the shores of Grand Lake.  Opened in 1931, the Grand Lake Generating Station accessed coal from nearby deposits.  An NB Power subsidiary, NB Coal, was the only mining company left in the Minto area and performed strip mining. NB Power closed the Grand Lake Station when its operating license expired in June 2010. As the Station has been NB Coal’s only customer since 2000, NB Coal closed in December 2009.  On April 19, 2012 the Grand Lake Generating Station was demolished, and by this time all coal mining in Minto had ended.

World War II internment camp
During the Second World War, the largest internment camp in eastern Canada was located in the hamlet of Ripples, 10 km west of the village of Minto. Originally it was home to German and Austrian Jews who had fled the Nazis to England.
Some youths later became notable, including theologian Gregory Baum, chemist Ernest Eliel and physicist Walter Kohn. Later after these Jewish refugees had been released into Canadian life, it became a camp mostly for German prisoners of war, as well as some sympathizers such as Canadian fascist Adrien Arcand. Its most notable prisoner at this time was the anti-conscriptionist mayor of Montreal, Camillien Houde.

This internment camp is now a protected site visited by tourists.  The only structure remaining at the site is the base of a water-tower where a plaque stands, visible from the highway.  A walking trail leads into the forest where a few ruins of the camp and posted signs describing the area may be found.  There is a small museum dedicated to the camp located within Minto's municipal building.

Climate

Demographics 

Recreational activities
Though Minto is a very small community, there are recreational activities that take place year-round. It has the Minto Centennial Arena, lighted and unlighted ball parks, two family parks, nature trails, mountain bike trails, and hunting and fishing resources.

Each year there are two festivals in Minto.  In summer the Minto Coal Mining Festival) is celebrated in June–July, first run in 1972.  The Santa Claus Parade and Tree Lighting Ceremony is celebrated in November–December, with the first annual parade held in 2010.

Once a year mountain bike racers descend on the town of Minto for a race known as 'The Coal Miner's Lung'. The endurance race covers 20 km, 40 km or 60 km of Minto single track.

Education
There are two schools in Minto: Minto Elementary and Middle School, and Minto Memorial High School.  Both schools offer extracurricular activities including sports clubs, destination conservation, peer helpers and student government. While Minto Elementary and Middle School is a newer building, Minto High has required some updates since the school was founded in 1939; the gym on the main floor has recently been renovated into a theatre (which MEMS has) and got a new gym located in the basement along with a shop room. In 2011 the New Brunswick Community College (NBCC) Fredericton campus established a satellite campus the Minto Regional Delivery Site.

Notable people

Marjorie Taylor Morell (1918-2004), author of Of Mines and Men; 1995 recipient of United Nations Community Service Award

See also
List of communities in New Brunswick

References

External links
 Village of Minto

Communities in Sunbury County, New Brunswick
Communities in Queens County, New Brunswick
Former villages in New Brunswick
Mining communities in New Brunswick
World War II internment camps in Canada